Terry Allen White (born 1959) is an American prelate who is the eighth and current Bishop of Kentucky.

Early life and education
White was born in 1959, in Mount Pleasant, Iowa. He studied at the Iowa Wesleyan College and graduated with a Bachelor of Arts in religion and philosophy in 1982. He then earned a Master of Divinity from Seabury-Western Theological Seminary in 1985. He was awarded a Doctor of Divinity from Seabury in 2011.

Ordained ministry
White was ordained a deacon in 1985 and priest in 1986. Between 1985 and 1987, he served as curate at Christ Church in Winnetka, Illinois, before becoming rector of St Boniface's Church in Chilton, Wisconsin in 1987. In 1991, he became vicar of St Paul's Church in Plymouth, Illinois and in 1995 became rector of Trinity Church, Highland Park, Illinois. In 2004, he was appointed as Dean of Grace and Holy Trinity Cathedral in Kansas City, Missouri.

Bishop
On June 5, 2010, White was elected on the second ballot as Bishop of Kentucky during a special electing convention held at Christ Church Cathedral in Louisville, Kentucky.  His election was confirmed with the required consents from the House of Bishops on September 16, 2010, and was consecrated on September 25, 2010, in the Galt House, by Presiding Bishop Katharine Jefferts Schori.

See also

 List of Episcopal bishops of the United States
 Historical list of the Episcopal bishops of the United States

References 

Episcopal Clerical Directory 2015

External links 
Episcopal Church website

1959 births
Living people
Episcopal bishops of Kentucky